The Heinkel He 118 was a prototype German monoplane dive bomber design that lost out to the Junkers Ju 87 Stuka in the 1930s, and was never ordered by the Luftwaffe.

Design
Designed by the Günter brothers, the He 118 followed many of the design notes of the Günter's designs of the era, notably the elliptical wing planform and rounded tail surfaces. It was in many ways an aluminum version of the mixed-construction Heinkel He 70 Blitz, strengthened for dive bombing.

It was a conventional cantilever monoplane with an inverted gull wing of elliptical planform mounted midway up the fuselage. It was considerably more streamlined than the Junkers competitor, with retractable landing gear and an internal bomb bay.

As designed it was limited to filling a role similar to an attack bomber like the Henschel Hs 123 rather than a true dive bomber like the Junkers Ju 87. It was limited to bombing from a shallow angle, more properly known as "glide bombing", with the second crew member acting as the bomb aimer.

Production and testing
In trials, it was discovered that the maximum dive angle was only 50°.
In June 1936, Ernst Udet took the He 118 on a test flight but after commencing his first dive from about 13,000 feet the propeller suddenly feathered, shearing the reduction gears, and the He 118 disintegrated, leaving Udet to parachute to safety. The Ju 87 repeatedly demonstrated dives at 90 degrees with no trouble, and so won the contract.

Heinkel complained in his biography that Udet ignored instructions and flew the aircraft outside of its limits. He suggests that the failure doomed his design, in spite of being unable to dive vertically like the Stuka.

Of the 15 He 118s built, two went to Japan where they were designated DXHe, however the aircraft disintegrated during Japanese flight tests. The 13-Shi (1939) design specification that led to the Yokosuka D4Y naval dive bomber may have been inspired by the He 118, but otherwise the two aircraft had little in common.

Heinkel used another example as a flying testbed for the Heinkel HeS 3 turbojet, with the jet engine slung under its fuselage. Although its pilot took off and landed using the He 118's piston engine, he started the turbojet engine in flight and flew under its power in July 1939, the first time an aircraft flew under jet power. The following month the similarly powered, fixed conventional landing gear-fitted Heinkel He 178 V1 would make the first flight powered entirely by a turbojet engine.

Variants
 He 118 : Dive bomber prototypes.
 He 118A-1 : Eight production aircraft, powered by a 634 kW (850 hp) DB 600C engine.
 DXHe1: Two He 118s supplied to the Imperial Japanese Navy Air Service for evaluation in 1938.

Operators

Imperial Japanese Navy

Specifications (He 118 V3)

See also

References

Inverted gull-wing aircraft
1930s German bomber aircraft
He 118
Single-engined tractor aircraft